Little Miss Marker (also known as The Girl in Pawn) is an American Pre-Code 1934 comedy-drama film directed by Alexander Hall. It was written by William R. Lipman, Sam Hellman, and Gladys Lehman after a 1932 short story of the same name by Damon Runyon. It stars Shirley Temple, Adolphe Menjou and Dorothy Dell in a story about a young girl held as collateral by gangsters. It was Temple's first starring role in a major motion picture and was crucial to establishing her as a major film star. It was inducted into the National Film Registry by the Library of Congress in 1998  and has been remade several times.

Plot
The film tells the story of "Marky" (Shirley Temple), whose father gives her to a gangster-run gambling operation as a "marker" (collateral) for a bet. When he loses his bet and commits suicide, the gangsters are left with her on their hands. They decide to keep her temporarily and use her to help pull off one of their fixed races, naming her the owner of the horse to be used in the race.

Marky is sent to live with bookie Sorrowful Jones (Adolphe Menjou). Initially upset about being forced to look after her, he eventually begins to develop a father–daughter relationship with her. His fellow gangsters become fond of her and begin to fill the roles of her extended family. Bangles (Dorothy Dell) – girlfriend of gang kingpin Big Steve (Charles Bickford), who has gone to Chicago to place bets on the horse – also begins to care for Marky, and to fall in love with Sorrowful, whose own concern for Marky shows he has a warm heart beneath his hard-man persona. Encouraged by Bangles and Marky, Sorrowful gets a bigger apartment, buys Marky new clothes and himself a better cut of suit, reads her bedtime stories, and shows her how to pray.

However, being around the gang has a somewhat bad influence on Marky, and she begins to develop a cynical nature and a wide vocabulary of gambling terminology and slang. Worried that her acquired bad-girl attitude means she will not get adopted by a "good family", Bangles and Sorrowful put on a party with gangsters dressed up as knights-of-the-round-table, to rekindle her former sweetness. She is unimpressed until they bring in the horse and parade her around on its back. Returning to New York, Big Steve frightens the horse, which throws her, and she is taken to the hospital. Big Steve goes there to pay back Sorrowful for trying to steal Bangles but is roped into giving Marky the direct blood transfusion she needs for her life-saving operation. Praying for her survival, Sorrowful destroys the drug which, administered to the horse, would have helped it win the race but killed it soon after. Informed that he has "good blood" and pleased to have given life for a change, Big Steve forgives Bangles and Sorrowful. They plan to marry and adopt Marky.

Cast
 Shirley Temple as Marthy "Marky" Jane
 Adolphe Menjou as Sorrowful Jones
 Dorothy Dell as Bangles Carson
 Charles Bickford as Big Steve Halloway
 Lynne Overman as Regret. The character is meant to be Mafia accountant Otto Berman, best friend of writer Damon Runyon.
 Warren Hymer as Sore Toe
 Sam Hardy as Benny the Gouge
 John Kelly as Canvas Back
 Willie Best as Dizzy Memphis
 Frank McGlynn Sr. as Doc Chesley
 John Sheehan as Sun Rise
 Frank Conroy as Dr. Ingalls

Production
Temple, who had previously auditioned for the role of Marky prior to entering her Fox contract and failed to win the part, was loaned out to Paramount by Fox Film thanks in large part to maneuvering by her mother Gertrude. Her mother, recognizing the potential of the role, arranged for a secret meeting and second audition with the director Alexander Hall. This second audition was successful and Shirley Temple was loaned out to Paramount for $1,000 a week. Temple and Dell struck up a close friendship while filming the movie. The scene in which Temple is refusing her food and using rude language ("I don't want no mush" and "I used to be a sissy") had to be redone as Dell could not contain her laughter in the first take. This would be Dell's last completed film of her short career. Temple took Dell's death very hard.

Reception
The film was considered a success at the box office. As a result Paramount offered Fox $50,000 for Temple's contract, but the offer was declined.

Recognition
In 1998, Little Miss Marker was selected for preservation in the United States National Film Registry by the Library of Congress as being "culturally, historically, or aesthetically significant".

Remakes
The film was remade as Little Big Shot (1935), Sorrowful Jones (1949) with Bob Hope and Lucille Ball and again as Little Miss Marker (1980) with Walter Matthau, Julie Andrews, Tony Curtis, Bob Newhart, Brian Dennehy and Lee Grant. Another remake was 40 Pounds of Trouble (1962), starring Tony Curtis as a casino manager who is left with an eight-year-old girl.

Stage musical 
Scott Ellis and David Thompson are working on a musical adaptation of the film to feature songs by Harold Arlen as its score.[1]

Other references 
The plot and title of the film are referenced by the book Little Myth Marker, part of Robert Asprin's MythAdventures series.

See also
 Shirley Temple filmography

References

External links
 Little Miss Marker essay  by  John F. Kasson on the National Film Registry website

 
 
 
 
 Little Miss Marker essay by Daniel Eagan in America's Film Legacy: The Authoritative Guide to the Landmark Movies in the National Film Registry, A&C Black, 2010 , pages 

1934 films
1934 comedy-drama films
American black-and-white films
American comedy-drama films
Films about children
Films based on short fiction
Films directed by Alexander Hall
Films about gambling
American horse racing films
United States National Film Registry films
Paramount Pictures films
1930s English-language films
1930s American films